Euxestonotus is a genus of parasitoid wasps belonging to the family Platygastridae.

The species of this genus are found in Europe and America.

Species:
 Euxestonotus achilles Buhl, 1998
 Euxestonotus acuticornis Buhl, 1995

References

Platygastridae
Hymenoptera genera